HMHS is an acronym for His/Her Majesty's Hospital Ship.

Early modern era

Seventeenth century
The earliest record of British hospital ship was Goodwill, which briefly accompanied a Royal Navy squadron in the Mediterranean in 1608 or 1609. From 1665 the Royal Navy formally maintained two hospital ships at any time, these being either hired merchant ship or elderly sixth rates, modified from their original design by the removal of internal bulkheads and addition of ports cut through the deck and hull for ventilation. The limit of two hospital ships at a time remained in place until the Nine Years' War at century's end. In 1691 there were four hospital ships in service, rising to five in 1693 and six in 1696.

In addition to their sailing crew, these seventeenth century hospital ships were staffed by a surgeon and four surgeon's mates. Standard medical supplies were bandages, soap, needles and bedpans, and patients were issued with a clean pair of sheets. Infectious patients were quarantined from the general population behind a sheet of canvas. In addition to her sailing crew, each vessel was staffed with a surgeon and four surgeon's mates. The quality of food was very poor. In the 1690s the surgeon aboard Siam complained that the meat was in an advanced state of putrefaction, the biscuits were weevil-ridden and bitter, and the bread was so hard that it stripped the skin from patient's mouths.

Eighteenth century

Boxer Rebellion
HMHS Carthage
HMHS Gwalior
HMHS Maine

Second Boer War
HMHS Avoca
HMHS Dunera
HMHS Lismore Castle
HMHS Maine
HMHS Nubia
HMHS Orcana
HMHS Princess of Wales
HMHS Simla
HMHS Spartan
HMHS Trojan

World War I
HMHS Aberdonian
HMHS Agadir
HMHS Albion
HMHS Alexandra

HMHS Aquitania
HMHS Araguaya
HMHS Assaye

HMHS Berbice
HMHS Brighton

HMHS Cambria
HMHS Carisbrook Castle
HMHS Cecilia

HMHS Copenhagen
HMHS Delta
HMHS Devanha
HMHS Dieppe
HMHS Donegal
HMHS Dongola

HMHS Drina
HMHS Dunluce Castle
HMHS Dunvegan Castle

HMHS Egypt
HMHS Ellora
HMHS Erin
HMHS Erinpura
HMHS Essequibo
HMHS Formosa
HMHS GalekaHMHS Glengorm CastleHMHS GoorkhaHMHS GrantalaHMHS Grantully CastleHMHS GrianaigHMHS Guildford CastleHMHS HerefordshireHMHS Kalyan
HMHS KanownaHMHS KaraparaHMHS KaroolaHMHS KyarraHMHS Letitia (1912), which served at Gallipoli.

HMHS Loyalty
HMHS MadrasHMHS Magic IIHMHS MahenoHMHS MaramaHMHS Mauretania
HMHS MoreaHMHS NewhavenHMHS OxfordshireHMHS PanamaHMHS PlassyHMHS Queen AlexandraHMHS Rohilla

HMHS SheelahHMHS SiciliaHMHS SomaliHMHS SoudanHMHS St. AndrewHMHS St. Denis
HMHS St. George
HMHS St. Margaret of Scotland
HMHS St. Patrick
HMHS SunbeamHMHS SyriaHMHS TakadaHMHS ValdiviaHMHS VarelaHMHS VarsovaHMHS VasnaHMHS VitaHMHS WandillaHMHS WarildaHMHS Western AustraliaRussian Civil War
HMHS Braemar Castle
HMHS Garth Castle
HMHS Kalyan

Former Royal Naval Hospitals
 RNH Bighi (Malta)
 RNH Gibraltar
 RNH Haslar (Gosport England)
 RNH Mtarfa (Malta)
 RNH Portland (Portland England)
 RNH Simon's Town (South Africa)
 RNH Stonehouse (Devonport, England)
 RNH Hong Kong
 RNH Trincomalee (Trincomalee)

World War II
HMHS AbaHMHS AmarapooraHMHS Amsterdam
HMHS AtlantisHMHS BrightonHMHS Cap St JacquesHMHS DinardHMHS DorsetshireHMHS Duke of ArgyllHMHS Duke of LancasterHMHS Duke of RothesayHMHS El NilHMHS GerusalemmeHMHS Isle of GuernseyHMHS Isle of JerseyHMHS KaraparaHMHS KaroaHMHS Lady ConnaughtHMHS Lady NelsonHMHS LeinsterHMHS Letitia
HMHS Llandovery CastleHMHS Maid of Kent
HMHS Manunda
HMHS MaunganuiHMHS NaushonHMHS OxfordshireHMHS ParisHMHS PragueHMHS St AndrewHMHS St DavidHMHS St JulienHMHS TaireaHMHS TalambaHMHS Takliwa
HMHS VasnaHMHS VitaHMHS WanganellaHMHS Worthing''

Falklands War hospital ships

RFA hospital ships
Royal Fleet Auxiliary hospital ships:
 
 
 
 
  (casualty receiving ship until 2024, not a hospital ship per Hague Convention X of 1907)

Citations

Notes

References

Lists of Royal Navy ships by type
Royal Navy
Hospital ships of the Royal Navy
Military medicine in the United Kingdom